Mount Stephenson a mountain in Antarctica.

The mountain was probably first seen in 1909 by the French Antarctic Expedition under Charcot, but not recognized as part of the Douglas Range. It was first surveyed in 1936 by Stephenson, Fleming, and Bertram of the British Graham Land Expedition (BGLE) under Rymill. The east side of the mountain was resurveyed in 1948 by the Falkland Islands Dependencies Survey (FIDS) who named the feature for Alfred Stephenson, surveyor and leader of the BGLE party to George VI Sound in 1936. Another landform on Alexander Island happens to be named for Alfred Stephenson, Stephenson Nunatak.

See also
 List of Ultras of Antarctica
 Mount Huckle
 Mount Ethelwulf
 Mount Spivey

Notes

References

Mountains of Alexander Island